The Village Under the Sky is a 1953 West German drama film directed by Richard Häussler and starring Inge Egger, Robert Freitag and Renate Mannhardt.  It was made at the Bavaria Studios in Munich and on location at Ötztal in the Alps. The film's sets were designed by the art director Robert Herlth. It was based on the short story Der Januck by Rolf Olsen.

Cast
 Inge Egger as Maria Firner
 Robert Freitag as Dr. Michael Ellert
 Renate Mannhardt as Anja, Dorfwirtin
 Peter Mosbacher as Schmuggler Lois
 Hedwig Wangel as Luccia, Kräuterweib
 Heinrich Gretler as Pfarrer Randlmann
 Franz Muxeneder as Beppo, der Narr
 Gustl Gstettenbaur as Schmuggler Toni
 Sepp Rist as Vincenz, Dorfwirt
 Walter Ladengast as Schmuggler Kaspar
 Beppo Schwaiger

References

Bibliography 
 Bock, Hans-Michael & Bergfelder, Tim. The Concise CineGraph. Encyclopedia of German Cinema. Berghahn Books, 2009.
 Goble, Alan. The Complete Index to Literary Sources in Film. Walter de Gruyter, 1999.

External links 
 

1953 films
West German films
German drama films
1953 drama films
1950s German-language films
Films directed by Richard Häussler
Films set in the Alps
German black-and-white films
1950s German films
Films shot at Bavaria Studios